Bera is an upazila of Pabna District in the Division of Rajshahi, Bangladesh.

Geography
It is known as 2nd Adamjee because there is big market for jute and different types of Jute Buildings are available here. It has also many milk-processing factories.

Bera has some small forests where there live some wild animals like foxes, mongooses, different types of wild cats etc. But these forests and animals are going to be vanished because of killing animals and trees.

Demographics
As of the 1991 Bangladesh census, Bera has a population of 208,897. Males constitute 52.11% of the population, and females 47.89%. This Upazila's 18-up population is 100,253. Bera has an average literacy rate of 24.1% (7+ years), and the national average of 32.4% literate.

Administration
Bera Upazila is divided into Bera Municipality and eight union parishads: Dhalar Char, Haturia Nakalia, Jatshakhni, Kytola, Masundia, Nutan Bharenga, Puran Bharenga, and Ruppur. The union parishads are subdivided into 163 mauzas and 162 villages.

Bera Municipality is subdivided into 9 wards and 26 mahallas.

Chairman: Muhammad Abdul kader

Vice Chairman: Md. Mijbah Mollah

Woman Vice Chairman: Most. Asma Khatun

Upazila Nirbahi Officer (UNO): Ashif Anam Siddique

Notable people
Osman Ghani Khan, politician

See also
Upazilas of Bangladesh
Districts of Bangladesh
Divisions of Bangladesh

References

Upazilas of Pabna District